The black-faced cuckooshrike (Coracina novaehollandiae) is a common omnivorous passerine bird native to Australia and southern New Guinea. It has a protected status in Australia, under the National Parks and Wildlife Act, 1974.

They are widely distributed in almost any wooded habitat throughout the region, except in rainforests. But they can also occur in urban areas, and are a fairly common sight on power lines in Australian cities such as Sydney and Perth.

Taxonomy

The black-faced cuckooshrike was first described by German naturalist Johann Friedrich Gmelin in 1789. The Yindjibarndi people of the central and western Pilbara know the species as julgira; they would clip their wings and keep them as pets.

Description
Adult birds have a prominent black face and throat, gray plumage, white underparts and a somewhat hooked bill. The size varies between 32 cm and 34 cm. They are slow-moving, inconspicuous birds, with a shrill, screaming call, sounding like creearck.

Behaviour
The diet consists of insects, their larvae, caterpillars or other invertebrates. These may be caught in flight, or caught when searching through the foliage. In addition, some fruits and seeds are also eaten.

Breeding season is chiefly from August to February each year. Both partners build the rather small nest. The fledglings leave the nest after about three weeks of hatching. They look like the adults, except the black facial mask is reduced to an eye stripe.

Outside the breeding season, they like to flock in groups of up to a hundred birds. Some may be partially migratory or they may remain in the same territory. Lack of significant differences between regional populations in Australia makes it difficult to determine where populations move in winter.

References 

 Gould, J. 1838. A Synopsis of the Birds of Australia, and the Adjacent Islands. London : J. Gould 8 pp., 73 pls.
 Mathews, G.M. 1911. Untitled. Bulletin of the British Ornithologists' Club 27(171): 99–101
 Schodde, R. & Mason, I.J. 1999. The Directory of Australian Birds : Passerines. A Taxonomic and Zoogeographic Atlas of the Biodiversity of Birds in Australia and its Territories. Collingwood, Australia : CSIRO Publishing x 851 pp. (Black-faced Cuckoo-shrike)

External links 

 Black-faced cuckooshrike videos, photos & sounds on the Internet Bird Collection

black-faced cuckooshrike
Birds of Australia
Birds of New Guinea
black-faced cuckooshrike
black-faced cuckooshrike
Articles containing video clips